Esmee Anna Hawkey (born 2 March 1998 in Chislehurst) is a British racing driver who currently competes in Deutsche Tourenwagen Masters, driving a Lamborghini Huracán GT3 Evo for T3 Motorsport.

Biography
Inspired by her father, Hawkey began racing karts at the age of ten. She had previously attended ballet and tap dancing classes, but chose to leave both in order to pursue a career in motorsport. Hawkey moved up to the Ginetta Junior Championship in 2014. Her first season would consist of a part-time schedule as a result of external commitments, and would score a best result of two 15th places in the six races she contested. She would stay in the Ginettas for 2015, switching to the JHR Developments team, however would be one of only two regular drivers (out of 25) who would fail to score a top-ten all season.

Hawkey would become a Porsche junior driver in 2016, and would race a Cayman in the GT4 Class of the UK GT Cup for the next two seasons, with a best championship position of 2nd in 2016. Her GT Marques team would promote her to their Porsche Carrera Cup program in 2018, placing her in the Pro-Am class. She would finish the season 5th in class with two podiums, and would be retained for 2019. Hawkey has had a number of successful results in Porsche Carrera Cup and is the 2020 Pro-Am Champion.

She would be announced as one of the 18 permanent drivers for the inaugural season of the W Series. Hawkey would finish 12th in her maiden open-wheel race at Hockenheim having run in the points for a large portion of the race, but caused a collision with Gosia Rdest at Circuit Zolder that would take both drivers out of the race. The highlight of her campaign was a 3rd place in qualifying at the final round in Brands Hatch, but she stalled on the grid and finished 16th – her only points of the season came in a race of attrition at the Norisring and left her 15th in the standings.

Having tested for British Touring Car Championship team MB Motorsport in early 2020, she returned to the Porsche Carrera Cup GB with Team Parker Racing, where she won the first 4 races straight in the Pro-Am class, finishing the season as champion. She signed with Iron Lynx Motorsport Lab to contest the 2021 European Le Mans Series in their Iron Dames GTE-spec Ferrari, but had her contract terminated before the first round due to incorrect license grading being provided to the FIA.

In 2021, Hawkey received backing from ROKiT and joined German racing team T3 Motorsport to drive a Lamborghini Huracán GT3 Evo full-time in the Deutsche Tourenwagen Masters, the leading Germany-based touring car racing series. After scoring two championship points in her first season in the Deutsche Tourenwagen Masters, she returned for a second season in 2022 with the same team and car but pulled out after two rounds due to a lack of funding.

Racing record

Career summary

* Season still in progress.

Complete W Series results
(key) (Races in bold indicate pole position) (Races in italics indicate fastest lap)

Complete Deutsche Tourenwagen Masters results 
(key) (Races in bold indicate pole position) (Races in italics indicate fastest lap)

References

External links

Profile at Driver Database
Website

British racing drivers
English racing drivers
English female racing drivers
1998 births
Living people
People from Chislehurst
Sportspeople from London
W Series drivers
Porsche Carrera Cup GB drivers
Deutsche Tourenwagen Masters drivers
Ginetta Junior Championship drivers
JHR Developments drivers